The 1st AARP Movies for Grownups Awards, presented by AARP the Magazine, honored films released in 2001 made by and for people over the age of 50. The awards were announced in the May/June issue of AARP the Magazine, which had recently been created by merging AARP's previous magazines, Modern Maturity and My Generation into one publication.

The awards were created by editor Bill Newcott after My Generation discontinued its movie review column due to a lack of films targeted to a 50-plus audience. The goal, according to AARP, was to encourage Hollywood to make films for older adults by rewarding the best examples of the genre. Winners and nominees in seven categories were announced simultaneously in the magazine, and were selected by an advisory board including Newcott and critics from Time, ABC, TV Guide Online, and USA Today. As in other years before the establishment of an in-person ceremony, winners were mailed trophies of a gold theater seat called La Chaise d'Or.

Awards

Winners and Nominees

Winners are listed first, highlighted in boldface, and indicated with a double dagger.

Best/Worst Awards
 Best Treatment of a Delicate Subject: Iris
 Worst Treatment of a Delicate Subject: Freddy Got Fingered
 Best Old-Age Makeup: Russell Crowe in A Beautiful Mind
 Worst Old-Age Makeup: Jennifer Connelly in A Beautiful Mind
 Best Over-60 Romance Movie: Innocence "for having the guts to try it"
 Worst Over-60 Romance Movie: Innocence "Er, now let's try it in a good movie."
 Best Role Model: David Kelly in Greenfingers
 Worst Role Model: Ben Kingsley in Sexy Beast
 Best Grandparent: Julie Andrews in The Princess Diaries
 Worst Grandparents: Liliane Rovère and Dominique Rozan in With a Friend Like Harry
 Most Athletic Performance: Morgan Freeman in Along Came a Spider
 Least Athletic Performance: Marlon Brando in The Score

Films with multiple nominations

References

AARP Movies for Grownups Awards
AARP